55P/Tempel–Tuttle (commonly known as Comet Tempel–Tuttle) is a periodic comet with an orbital period of 33 years. It fits the classical definition of a Halley-type comet with a period of between 20 and 200 years. It was independently discovered by Wilhelm Tempel on December 19, 1865, and by Horace Parnell Tuttle on January 6, 1866.

It is the parent body of the Leonid meteor shower. In 1699, it was observed by Gottfried Kirch but was not recognized as a periodic comet until the discoveries by Tempel and Tuttle during the 1866 perihelion. In 1933, S. Kanda deduced that the comet of 1366 was Tempel–Tuttle, which was confirmed by Joachim Schubart in 1965. On 26 October 1366, the comet passed  from Earth.

The orbit of 55P/Tempel–Tuttle intersects that of Earth nearly exactly, hence streams of material ejected from the comet during perihelion passes do not have to spread out over time to encounter Earth. This coincidence means that streams from the comet at perihelion are still dense when they encounter Earth, resulting in the 33-year cycle of Leonid meteor storms. For example, in November 2009, the Earth passed through meteors left behind mainly from the 1466 and 1533 orbit.

In February, 2016, two bolides detected by the NASA All-Sky Fireball Network were calculated to have orbits consistent with those of 55P, although with a node 100 degrees less than 55P. The reason for this is yet to be determined.

55P/Tempel–Tuttle is estimated to have a nucleus of mass 1.2 kg and radius 1.8 km and a stream of mass 5 kg.

See also
Comet IRAS–Araki–Alcock (Comet close approach 1983)
Lexell's Comet (Lost comet close approach in 1770)
252P/LINEAR (Close approach 2016)
P/2016 BA14 (Close approach 2016)

References

External links 
 Orbital simulation from JPL (Java) / Horizons Ephemeris
 Gary W. Kronk's Cometography

Periodic comets
Halley-type comets
0055
055P
Meteor shower progenitors
18650119